Vokhma is a rural locality (a settlement) and the administrative center of Vokhomsky District, Kostroma Oblast, Russia. Population:

References

Notes

Sources

Rural localities in Kostroma Oblast
Vokhomsky District
Former urban-type settlements of Kostroma Oblast